Contrast-induced nephropathy (CIN) is a purported form of kidney damage in which there has been recent exposure to medical imaging contrast material without another clear cause for the acute kidney injury.

Despite extensive speculation, the actual occurrence of contrast-induced nephropathy has not been demonstrated in the literature.

Analysis of observational studies has shown that radiocontrast use in CT scanning is not causally related to changes in kidney function.

Terminology
Given the increasing doubts about the contribution of radiocontrast to acute kidney injury, the American College of Radiology has proposed the name contrast-associated acute kidney injury (CA-AKI) (formerly referred to as post-contrast acute kidney injury; PC-AKI) does not imply a causal role, with the name contrast-induced acute kidney injury (CI-AKI) (formerly referred to as contrast-induced nephropathy; CIN) reserved for the rare cases where radiocontrast is likely to be causally related.

Risk factors
There are multiple risk factors of contrast-induced nephropathy, whereof a 2016 review emphasized chronic kidney disease, diabetes mellitus, high blood pressure, reduced intravascular volume, and old age.

Decreased kidney function
European guidelines classify a pre-existing decreased kidney function to be a risk factor of contrast-induced nephropathy in the following cases:
 Estimated glomerular filtration rate (eGFR) < 45 ml/min/1.73 m2 of body surface area before intra-arterial administration with first-pass renal exposure (not passing lungs or peripheral circulation before kidneys), or in the intensive care unit
 eGFR < 30 ml/min/1.73 m2 before intravenous administration or intra-arterial administration with second-pass renal exposure
 Known or suspected acute kidney injury

To calculate estimated GFR from creatinine, European guidelines use the CKD-EPI formula in adults ≥ 18 years, and the revised Schwartz formula in children. Swedish guidelines recommends no specific formula in children because of lack of evidence, but on the other hand recommends GFR based on cystatin C rather than creatinine in those with abnormal muscle mass or liver failure or cirrhosis.

Mehran score
The Mehran score is a clinical prediction rule to estimate probability of CIN which includes the following risk factors: systolic blood pressure <80 mm Hg for at least one hour requiring inotropic support, intra-arterial balloon pump, congestive heart failure with NYHA class III or worse, history of pulmonary edema, age >75 years, hematocrit level <39% for men and <35% for women, diabetes mellitus, contrast media volume, decreased kidney function (serum creatinine level >1.5 g/dL or decreased estimated glomerular filtration rate).

Other factors
European guidelines include the following procedure-related risk factors:
 Large doses of contrast given intra-arterially with first-pass renal exposure
 Use of contrast agents with high osmolality (limited use today)
 Multiple contrast injections within 48–72 h. Swedish guidelines also include gadolinium MRI contrast agents in this aspect.

Swedish guidelines list the following additional risk factors:
 Hypoxia
 Cirrhosis
 NSAID or nephrotoxic medication
 Individuals on dialysis with residual renal function of at least 400 ml urine/24h
 Individuals having undergone kidney transplantation

Prevention
The main alternatives in people with a risk of contrast-induced nephropathy are:
 Adjustment of the radiocontrast dose
 Treating or mitigating risk factors
 Using no intravenous contrast for the investigation.
 Switching to another modality such as ultrasonography or MRI.

Dose adjustment
According to European guidelines, the ratio of the contrast dose (in grams of iodine) divided by the absolute estimated glomerular filtration rate (GFR) should be less than 1.1 g/(ml/min) for intra-arterial contrast medium administration with first-pass renal exposure (not passing lungs or peripheral tissue before reaching the kidneys). Swedish guidelines are more restrictive, recommending a ratio of less than 0.5 g/(ml/min) in patients with risk factors and irrespective of route of administration, and even more caution in first-pass renal exposure.

Treating or mitigating risk factors
Hydration by drinking or intravenous volume expander, either before or after contrast administration, decreases the risk of contrast-induced nephropathy. Evidence also supports the use of N-acetylcysteine with intravenous saline among those getting low molecular weight contrast. The use of statins with N-acetylcysteine and intravenous saline is also supported.
 Oral hydration may be as effective as the intravenous route for volume expansion to prevent contrast-induced nephropathy, according to a review in 2013.
 Adenosine antagonists such as the methylxanthines theophylline and aminophylline, may help although studies have conflicting results.
 N-acetylcysteine (NAC) by mouth twice a day, on the day before and of the procedure if creatinine clearance is estimated to be less than 60 mL/min [1.00 mL/s]) may reduce risk. Some authors believe the benefit is not overwhelming. A systematic review concluded that NAC is "likely to be beneficial" but did not recommend a specific dose.
 Ascorbic acid may be protective against CIN, according to a systematic review of randomized controlled trials.
 Matched hydration, meaning infusion of a volume of normal saline equal to the urine output, has been found to reduce kidney injury, dialysis, adverse events and mortality compared to standard therapy.

Diagnosis
CIN is classically defined as a serum creatinine increase of at least 25% and/or an absolute increase in serum creatinine of 0.5 mg/dL after using iodine contrast agent without another clear cause for acute kidney injury, but other definitions have also been used.

The American College of Radiology recommends the usage of the AKIN criteria for the diagnosis of CIN or PC-AKI. The AKIN criteria states that the diagnosis is made if within 48 hours from intravascular contrast medium exposure one of the following occurs:

 Absolute serum creatinine increase of ≥0.3 mg/dl (>26.4 µmol/L)
 Relative serum creatinine increase of ≥50 % (≥1.5-fold above baseline)
 Urine output reduced to ≤0.5 mL/kg/hour for at least 6 hours

Mechanism
The mechanism of contrast-induced nephropathy is not entirely understood, but is thought to include direct damage from reactive oxygen species, contrast-induced increase in urine output, increased oxygen consumption, changes in dilation and narrowing of the blood vessels to the kidneys, and changes in urine viscosity.

Prognosis
It is unclear if CIN causes persisting decline in renal function since few studies has followed patients for more than 72 hours. In one meta-analysis the decline in renal function was shown to persist in 1.1 % of the patients with CIN.

Clinical relevance
Doubts regarding the significance of the phenomenon appeared in the scientific literature. Several studies have shown that intravenous contrast material administration was not associated with excess risk of acute kidney injury, dialysis, or death, even among patients with comorbidities reported to predispose them to nephrotoxicity. Moreover, hydration, the most established prevention measure to prevent contrast-induced nephropathy was shown to be ineffective in the POSEIDON trial, raising further doubts regarding the significance of this disease state. A meta-analysis of 28 studies of AKI after CT with radiocontrast showed no causal relationship between the use of radiocontrast and AKI.

References

External links 

Radiology
Kidney diseases